Hood Anthems is the debut solo album by Sean P. This album features the likes of Trae, Lloyd and Goodie Mob's Khujo Goodie. It contains a bonus disc featuring songs by other Ball or Fall Records artists like Da Fam Gang, Numskull and fellow Youngbloodz member J-Bo.

Track listing 
 "Intro"
 "Ballin Baby" (featuring Prince Bugsy and Kashflow)
 "I'm Hood" (featuring Kashflow)
 "Icy White Tees" (featuring Prince Bugsy and Taliban Bundy)
 "Rockstar" (featuring Kashflow and Numskull)
 "That's Fo Sho" (featuring Young Fell and Eddi Projex)
 "Soldier'D Up" (featuring Prince Bugsy)
 "Like This" (featuring Kujo Goodie and Trae)
 "If You Got A Problem"
 "They Aint Shit" (featuring Lloyd)
 "I Like What I See"
 "Do My Thang"
 "Going Hard"
 Performed by J-Bo
 "Get Dat Money Hoe"
 Performed by Da Fam Gang
 "40's In A Brown Bag"
 Performed by Numskull
 "Fam Gang Musik"
 Performed by Taliban Bundy
 "Sick Wid It"
 Performed by Prince Bugsy

2007 debut albums
Albums produced by T-Pain